Miss T World is a beauty pageant for transgender women. The First event took place on September 23, in the Alberti Theater, in the village of Desenzano del Garda, near the city of Brescia, in the region of Lombardy, in Italy.

The winner of the pageant, was Paula Bitushchini, the representative of Philippines, in the second place was for Sandy Lopes, the representative of Thailand. Alessia Cavalcanti was the representative of Italy.

In the contest participated 16 candidates. The event counted with the presence of Marcela Ohio, Miss International Queen 2013, Melissa Gurgel, Miss Brasil 2014, Trixie Maristela, Miss International Queen 2015, and Rafaela Manfrini, Miss Trans Star International 2016.
The last event place on 24 September 2022, at Centre Lucia Theater , in Brescia Italy.
The Winner of the pageant , was Valunpath ( Venus) Loysanun the representative of Thailand she was to be Miss T World 2022 , the second place of this year was Dominique the representative of Brazil. Miss T World 2021 was Victoria Fernandes from Brazil  , second place of 2021 was Luiza. Rebecca Valenttina Mathias representative of Brazil was Miss T World 2020 and the second place of 2020 was Aëla Chanel from France.

Titleholders

By number of wins

Runners-up

See also
 Miss International Queen
 Miss Continental
 Miss T Star Thailand
 Miss Tiffany's Universe
 Miss Trans Albania
 Miss Trans Israel
 Miss Trans Star International
 The World's Most Beautiful Transsexual Contest

References 

Transgender beauty pageants
Italian culture
Lombardy
LGBT beauty pageants